Knorringia sibirica is a species of flowering plant in the family Polygonaceae, native to Siberia to Korea. It was first described, as Polygonum sibiricum by Erik Laxmann in 1773, and transferred to Knorringia by Nikolai Tzvelev in 1987.

References

Polygonoideae
Flora of Siberia
Flora of Korea
Plants described in 1773